Al Casey may refer to:

 Al Casey (jazz guitarist) (1915–2005), American
 Al Casey (rock guitarist) (1936–2006), American

See also
Albert Vincent Casey, publisher